Rebecca Dalton is a Canadian actress known for her roles in the TV series Good Witch and Spun Out.

Early life
Dalton attended Oakville Trafalgar High School and St. Mildred's-Lightbourn School, and after graduating in 2006, travelled through South East Asia for five months, visiting Cambodia, Hong Kong, Thailand and Vietnam. On her return to Canada, she enrolled at Ryerson University in Toronto.

Personal life 
In July 2018, Dalton became engaged to IndyCar-driver James Hinchcliffe, with whom she attended his high school prom  in 2004. On 3 August 2019, Dalton and Hinchcliffe were married at the Muskoka Bay Club Resort in Gravenhurst, Ontario.

Career 
In 2010, Dalton made her on-screen appearance in an episode of the Canadian-American TV series Unnatural History in the role of Sally. In the same year she was also cast in the Canadian TV movie My Babysitter's a Vampire in the role of Della ('Popcorn Lady').

In 2013, Dalton was cast as Stephanie Lyons, one of the leading roles in the Canadian TV series Spun Out.

In 2015, Dalton was cast to replace Ashley Leggat in the recurring role of Tara for season two of the Hallmark Channel's series Good Witch, a role she reprised in subsequent seasons. In the same year she was also cast in the role of Katie Littleton in the 2016 TV movie Total Frat Party.

Dalton has also appeared in a number of Canadian TV movies, including RockyRoad (2014), A Perfect Christmas (2016),  Christmas Wedding Planner, (2017) and The Dog Lover's Guide to Dating (2023).

Filmography

References

External links 
 Rebecca Dalton on IMDb
 Rebecca Dalton (@beckyjhinch) on Instagram

1989 births
Actresses from Ontario
Canadian film actresses
Canadian television actresses
Living people
Racing drivers' wives and girlfriends